Nippononychus is a genus of harvestman in the family Paranonychidae. There is one described species in Nippononychus, N. japonicus, endemic to Japan.

References

Further reading

 
 
 

Harvestmen